The Gujarat Environment Management Institute (GEMI) is an Autonomous Institute under the Forests and Environment Department of Government of Gujarat. Established in 1999 and based in Gandhinagar, GEMI has been involved in the overall conservation, protection and management of environment and  has taken up various studies and research projects.

References

External links

State agencies of Gujarat
1999 establishments in Gujarat
Government agencies established in 1999
Gandhinagar